Nefopam, sold under the brand name Acupan among others, is a centrally acting, non-opioid painkilling medication, that is primarily used to treat moderate to severe pain.

Nefopam acts in the brain and spinal cord to relieve pain via novel mechanisms: antinociceptive effects from triple monoamine reuptake inhibition, and antihyperalgesic activity through modulation of glutamatergic transmission.

Medical uses
Nefopam is effective for prevention of shivering during surgery or recovery from surgery. Nefopam was significantly more effective than aspirin as an analgesic in one clinical trial, although with a greater incidence of side effects such as sweating, dizziness and nausea, especially at higher doses. The estimated relative potency of nefopam to morphine indicates that 20 mg of nefopam HCl is the approximate analgesic equal of 12 mg of morphine with comparable analgesic efficacy to morphine, or oxycodone, while nefopam tends to produce fewer side effects, does not produce respiratory depression, and has much less abuse potential, and so is useful either as an alternative to opioid analgesics, or as an adjunctive treatment for use alongside opioids or other types of analgesics. Nefopam is also used to treat severe hiccups.

Contraindications
Nefopam is contraindicated in people with convulsive disorders, those that have received treatment with irreversible monoamine oxidase inhibitors such as phenelzine, tranylcypromine or isocarboxazid within the past 30 days and those with myocardial infarction pain, mostly due to a lack of safety data in these conditions.

Side effects
Common side effects include nausea, nervousness, dry mouth, light-headedness and urinary retention. Less common side effects include vomiting, blurred vision, drowsiness, sweating, insomnia, headache, confusion, hallucinations, tachycardia, aggravation of angina and rarely a temporary and benign pink discolouration of the skin or erythema multiforme.

Overdose
Overdose and death have been reported with nefopam. Overdose usually manifests with convulsions, hallucinations, tachycardia, and hyperdynamic circulation. Treatment is usually supportive, managing cardiovascular complications with beta blockers and limiting absorption with activated charcoal.

Interactions 

It has additive anticholinergic and sympathomimetic effects with other agents with these properties. Its use should be avoided in people receiving some types of antidepressants (tricyclic antidepressants or monoamine oxidase inhibitors) as there is the potential for serotonin syndrome or hypertensive crises to result.

Pharmacology

The mechanism of action of nefopam and its analgesic effects are not well understood, although inhibition of the reuptake of serotonin, norepinephrine, and to a lesser extent dopamine (that is, acting as an ) is thought to be involved. It also reduces glutamate signaling via modulating sodium and calcium channels.

Pharmacokinetics
The absolute bioavailability of nefopam is low. It is reported to achieve therapeutic plasma concentrations between 49 and 183 nM. The drug is approximately 73% protein-bound across a plasma range of 7 to 226 ng/mL (28–892 nM). The metabolism of nefopam is hepatic, by N-demethylation and via other routes. Its terminal half-life is 3 to 8 hours, while that of its active metabolite, desmethylnefopam, is 10 to 15 hours. It is eliminated mostly in urine, and to a lesser extent in feces.

Chemistry
Nefopam is a cyclized analogue of orphenadrine, diphenhydramine, and tofenacin, with each of these compounds different from one another only by the presence of one or two carbons. The ring system of nefopam is a benzoxazocine system.

Society and culture

Recreational use
Recreational use of nefopam has rarely been reported, and is far less common than with opioid analgesics.

Names
In the 1960s, when it was first developed, it had the generic name fenazoxine.

See also 
 Troparil

References 

Analgesics
Drugs with unknown mechanisms of action
Muscarinic antagonists
Nitrogen heterocycles
Oxygen heterocycles
Sodium channel blockers